The 1956 Missouri gubernatorial election was held on November 6, 1956 and resulted in a victory for the Democratic nominee, Lt. Governor James T. Blair, Jr., over the Republican nominee, Lon Hocker.

Results

References

Gubernatorial
1956
Missouri
November 1956 events in the United States